Isoura is a genus of moths of the family Erebidae. The genus was erected by George Hampson in 1894.

Species
Isoura fuscicollis Butler, 1889
Isoura pratti Bethune-Baker, 1906

References

Calpinae